Brett Paul Gorvy (born July 1964) is a British art dealer. He is a co-founder and partner (with Dominique Lévy) of Lévy Gorvy, a gallery with offices in New York City, London, and Geneva.

Early life
Brett Gorvy was born in South Africa, one of four children of billionaire financier Manfred Gorvy and his wife, Lydia.

Career
In December 2016, Gorvy left his position as chairman and international head of Post-war and Contemporary Art at Christie's after 23 years.  It was then he set up his gallery with Dominique Lévy. This led to the rebranding of Levy's Madison Avenue Gallery as Lévy Gorvy.

Personal life
Gorvy is married to Amy Gold, an independent art dealer, who worked for Christie's for ten years, before becoming a senior director at the New York gallery L&M Arts, run by Dominique Lévy and Robert Mnuchin. They live on the Upper West Side in Manhattan and collect works on paper from the 1930s onwards. They have one daughter together.

References

External links
 Lévy Gorvy Gallery

1964 births
Living people
British art dealers
South African art dealers
South African emigrants to the United Kingdom